Stroganoff usually refers to beef Stroganoff, a Russian dish.

Stroganoff may also refer to:

 Stroganov family, a Russian noble family
 Stroganoff Madonna
 Alexander Grigorievich Stroganoff
 Elisabeth Alexandrovna Stroganoff
 Vasili Vasilievich Stroganoff